Ernest Rice may refer to:

 Ernest Rice (Royal Navy officer) (1840–1927), British admiral
 Ernest Rice (politician), Lieutenant Governor of Tennessee; see

See also
 Ernie Rice
 Ernest Price (disambiguation)